Golden Acres commonly refers to Golden Acres, Pasadena, Texas, in the United States.

Golden Acres may also refer to:
Golden Acres, Alberta, a locality in Parkland County, Alberta, Canada
Golden Acres, Fort Wayne, a neighborhood in Fort Wayne, Indiana, United States
Golden Acres, New Mexico, a census-designated place in the United States
Golden Acres National High School, Philippines

See also
Golden Acre (disambiguation)